Miriam Brouwer (born 14 November 1991) is a Canadian cyclist.

Brouwer began cycling when she bought her first bike at the age of 20. She graduated from the University of Toronto in 2016 with a Masters of Science with Honours in Speech and Language Pathology.

She competed at the 2018 Pan American Track Cycling Championships where she won a bronze medal in the team pursuit event and at the 2019 Pan American Games where she won silver medals in the team pursuit and women's madison events.

References

External links
 

1991 births
Living people
Sportspeople from Cambridge, Ontario
University of Toronto alumni
Canadian female cyclists
Cyclists at the 2019 Pan American Games
Pan American Games medalists in cycling
Pan American Games silver medalists for Canada
Medalists at the 2019 Pan American Games
21st-century Canadian women